Öcal is a Turkish surname. It may refer to:

 Ahmet Öcal (born 1979), Belgian footballer of Turkish descent
 Arda Ocal (born 1981), Turkish-Canadian TV and radio broadcaster
 Mert Öcal (born 1982), Turkish model
 Sevilay İmamoğlu Öcal (born 1984), Turkish female handball player

Turkish-language surnames